Koi... Mil Gaya is a 2003 Indian Hindi-language science fiction film directed and produced by Rakesh Roshan. Starring Hrithik Roshan and Preity Zinta, the film focuses on Rohit (Hrithik Roshan), a developmentally disabled man who comes into contact with an extraterrestrial being while using the computer of his late father Sanjay (Rakesh Roshan). In addition to writing the film's story, Rakesh Roshan also created its screenplay along with Sachin Bhowmick, Honey Irani, and Robin Bhatt. The cinematography was handled by Ravi K. Chandran and Sameer Arya, and the production designer was Sharmishta Roy. Farah Khan, Raju Khan, and Ganesh Hegde served as the choreographers, while Allan Amin and Tinu Verma completed the action direction. Rajesh Roshan and Sanjay Verma were the music director and editor, respectively.

Mil Gaya was released on 8 August 2003 and received positive reviews from critics. A commercial success, the film emerged as the second-highest-grossing Indian film of the year, earning  in India and abroad. The film won 35 awards out of 71 nominations; the direction, performances of the cast, choreography, and special effects garnered the most attention from various award groups.

Koi... Mil Gaya received three trophies at the 51st National Film Awards, including Best Film on Other Social Issues. At the 49th Filmfare Awards, the film was nominated in eleven categories, including Best Actress (Zinta), Best Supporting Actress (Rekha), and Best Performance in a Comic Role (Johnny Lever), and went on to win five of them including Best Film, Best Director for Rakesh Roshan, and Best Actor and Best Actor (Critics) for Hrithik Roshan. Among other wins, it also received six Bollywood Movie Awards, five International Indian Film Academy Awards, five Screen Awards, five Zee Cine Awards, and four Producers Guild Film Awards. 

Awards and nominations

Notes

References

External links 
 Awards and nominations received by Koi... Mil Gaya at IMDb

Koi... Mil Gaya